Commonwealth v Bank of New South Wales, was a Privy Council decision that affirmed the High Court of Australia's decision in Bank of New South Wales v Commonwealth, promoting the theory of "individual rights" to ensure freedom of interstate trade and commerce. The case dealt primarily with Section 92 of the Constitution of Australia.

Background
After two strong election wins, the Australian Labor Party government of Ben Chifley announced in 1947 its intention to nationalise private banks in Australia. It achieved this process by passing the Banking Act 1947. The policy proved very controversial, and the Bank of New South Wales challenged the constitutional validity of the law. The High Court found specific provisions of the law were invalid and struck them down. The Commonwealth government decided to appeal the decision in the Privy Council and in doing so adopted a deliberate strategy of limiting the grounds of appeal to avoid seeking a certificate from the High Court under section 74 of the Constitution.

High Court of Australia
The High Court held in Bank of New South Wales v Commonwealth that the Banking Act 1947 was unconstitutional on a number of grounds:
Section 92 of the Constitution, in providing that "trade, commerce, and intercourse among the States ... shall be absolutely free." conferred a positive right on the banks to engage in the business of interstate banking.
it involved the acquisition of property that was not "on just terms, contrary to section 51(xxxi) of the Constitution. The problem with acquisition arose out of the Act's sections detailing the appointment of new directors for all private banks with the power to control, manage, direct and dispose of assets of those banks. Dixon J held that this was a "circuitous device to acquire indirectly the substance of proprietary interest."
The Act, in setting up a "Court of Claims", invalidly attempted to oust the original jurisdiction of the High Court.

Privy Council
The Privy Council endorsed the High Court decision in adopting the individual rights approach. Provisions of the Commonwealth law prohibited private banks from carrying out interstate business banking. Interstate banking transactions under the law were thus not "absolutely free" and hence in violation of Section 92 of the Constitution. The Law Lords held that a simple legislative prohibition of interstate trade and commerce would be constitutionally invalid, but a law seeking to regulate or prescribe rules as to the manner of trade and commerce would not necessarily be in breach of Section 92. In addition, the act was held to be not an act with respect to banking, and therefore invalid under s51(xiii), the banking power.

See also
Australian constitutional law
UK company law
UK public service law
Russian Commercial and Industrial Bank v Comptoir d'Estcompte de Mulhouse [1923] 2 KB 630

Notes

References
 Winterton, G. et al. Australian federal constitutional law: commentary and materials, 1999. LBC Information Services, Sydney.

Judicial Committee of the Privy Council cases on appeal from Australia
Australian constitutional law
Freedom of interstate trade and commerce in the Australian Constitution cases
Acquisition of property in the Australian Constitution cases
1949 in case law
1949 in Australia